Argo Community High School is a public four-year high school located in Summit, Illinois, a western suburb of Chicago. The district draws students from the communities of Summit, Bedford Park, Bridgeview, Justice, Willow Springs, and a portion of Hickory Hills. The school was named for the area surrounding the large corn processing plant located near the school, which manufactured Argo corn starch and is currently owned by Ingredion. In 2014 and 2016, Argo was awarded a bronze medal by U.S. News & World Report for outstanding academic performance, the only school in the South Suburban Conference to receive such recognition.

On March 11, 2016, Democratic presidential candidate Bernie Sanders held a campaign rally at Argo that was attended by several thousand people.

On September 6, 1968, Argo had a Race Riot.  Yolande Robbins was key to mending the relationship between African American students and the school itself.  She was fired later for no cause.

Activities

Athletics
Argo competes as a member of the South Suburban Conference. It also competes in state championship series sponsored by the Illinois High School Association (IHSA).  School colors are Maroon and White. Teams are called the Argonauts. Argo sponsors interscholastic teams for men and women in basketball, bowling, cross country, golf, soccer, swimming and diving, tennis, track and field, volleyball, water polo and wrestling.  There are men's teams in baseball and football and women's teams in badminton and softball.

Notable alumni
 Bob Bercich, a former NFL safety for the Dallas Cowboys.
 Bill Damaschke, an animator and producer who was formerly an executive at DreamWorks.
 Kyle Hill, a former professional basketball player in Europe.  He was the second-round draft pick of the Dallas Mavericks in the 2001 NBA draft.
 Johnny Karras, a halfback for the Illinois team that won the 1952 Rose Bowl. He was the second-round choice of the Chicago Cardinals in the 1952 NFL draft.
 Ted Kluszewski, an MLB first baseman (1947–61) who played most of his career with the Cincinnati Reds. In 1998 the Cincinnati Reds retired his number.   1954 He hit three home runs for the Chicago White Sox in the 1959 World Series.
 Damon R. Leichty (Class of 1990), district judge
 Sheldon Mallory, a former MLB outfielder for the Oakland Athletics.
 Milan Mrksich (class of 1985), Vice President of Research and Henry Wade Rogers Professor of Biomedical Engineering at Northwestern University
 Dick Portillo (class of 1957), a restaurateur and founder of the Portillo Restaurant Group, the most notable business of which is Portillo's.
 Mamie Till, the fourth black graduate of Argo and mother of Emmett Till, whose murder served as a catalyst in the Civil Rights Movement. 
 Saul White Jr., a professional basketball player who is currently a member of the Harlem Globetrotters.
 Mike York (class of 1982), a former MLB pitcher for the Pittsburgh Pirates and the Cleveland Indians.

References 

School districts established in 1920
Public high schools in Cook County, Illinois
1920 establishments in Illinois